Rosa Parks is a 2013 bronze sculpture depicting the African-American civil rights activist of the same name, installed in the United States Capitol's National Statuary Hall, as part of the collection of the Architect of the Capitol. The statue was sculpted by Eugene Daub and co-designed by Rob Firmin. It is the only statue in the Hall not linked with a state, and the first full-length statue of an African American in the Capitol.

See also
 2013 in art
 Civil rights movement in popular culture
 Statue of Rosa Parks (Eugene, Oregon)

References

2013 establishments in Washington, D.C.
2013 sculptures
Bronze sculptures in Washington, D.C.
Memorials to Rosa Parks
Monuments and memorials in Washington, D.C.
Sculptures of African Americans
Sculptures of women in Washington, D.C.
Statues in Washington, D.C.
United States Capitol statues